Grey Ranks may refer to:

 The Gray Ranks (Szare Szeregi), the underground Polish Scouting Association (Związek Harcerstwa Polskiego) during World War II. 
 Grey Ranks (role-playing game), a story-telling game based on the Szare Szeregi.